Cliché (Hush Hush) is the reissue of Romanian recording artist Alexandra Stan's debut studio album, Saxobeats (2011). It was released for digital download on 2 October 2013 through Maan Studio; its deluxe edition was made available for digital and physical consumption on 23 October 2013 by Victor Entertainment. The record premiered following an alleged physical altercation with her former manager Marcel Prodan, which resulted in Stan taking a break from her career. Along with Andrei Nemirschi and Marcian Alin Soare, Prodan has written and produced nearly all the songs on Cliché (Hush Hush).

Being Stan's last activity with Prodan's label, the reissue additionally features three songs—"Lemonade", "Cliché (Hush Hush)" and "All My People"—which were released worldwide as singles, as intended for her second studio album. While "Lemonade" was certified Gold by the Federation of the Italian Music Industry (FIMI), the latter songs were moderately successful in Italy and Japan. Commercially, Cliché (Hush Hush) peaked at number fifty-three on the Oricon Albums Chart, having sold over 6,100 copies there.

Background and release

Alexandra Stan's second studio album was delayed following an alleged physical altercation with her former manager Marcel Prodan. Stan accused him of physically attacking and blackmailing her; she also appeared injured on Romanian television. Due to this, the singer eventually decided to take a break from her career. Meanwhile, Cliché (Hush Hush), her last activity under Prodan's label—Maan Studio—was made available for consumption in Japan on 2 October 2013; a deluxe version of the record was released on 23 October 2013. It serves as a reissue of Saxobeats (2011), additionally containing three new songs—"Lemonade", "Cliché (Hush Hush)" and "All My People"—which were previously released as singles and were intended for her second studio album. The physical edition of the record is packaged in an obi-stripped jewel case, whose booklet features the cover art of Saxobeats on its back and lyrics in Japanese.

Promotion
"Lemonade" was released as the first single from the reissue on 12 June 2012; its music video premiered on 4 June 2012. With music critics comparing the recording to the works of Ace of Base, Britney Spears, Lady Gaga and Kelis, "Lemonade" experienced commercial success in Europe and Japan. It peaked at number one in Bulgaria, and within the top forty in Hungary, Italy, Japan, Romania and Slovakia, being eventually certified Gold by the Federation of the Italian Music Industry (FIMI) for selling 15,000 copies in Italy. Subsequently, the title track of the record was made available for digital consumption on 3 October 2012, being promoted by a visual filmed by Iulian Moga at Palatul Snagov. The clip later drew comparison to vampire films for teenagers for a scene in which Stan is portrayed in a church surrounded by dark-clothed people. "Cliché (Hush Hush)" charted at number eleven on the Japan Hot 100, and at number fifty on Italy's FIMI chart. A "club-friendly" electro dance recording, "All My People", the last single from Cliché (Hush Hush) premiered on 1 May 2013 and featured the vocals of Prodan's fictional character, Manilla Maniacs. It was moderately successful in Italy, Japan and Romania, reaching the top sixty in the territories. The song's music video was compared by Alexandra Necula of Info Music to the work of Madonna, while its choreography to Michael Jackson's 1980s material.

Track listing
All lyrics written and produced by Andrei Nemirschi and Prodan, unless stated.

Personnel
Credits adapted from the liner notes of Cliché (Hush Hush).

Alexandra Stan – lead vocals
Carlprit – featured artist
Andrei Nemirschi – composer, producer, photography
Tokyo Yamada Design Office – design
Marcel Prodan – composer, producer
Marcian Alin Soare – composer
Shogo Yamada – art direction, design

Charts and sales

|-
! scope="row"| Japan (RIAJ)
| 
| 6,109
|}

Release history

References

Alexandra Stan albums
2012 albums
Reissue albums
Victor Entertainment albums